Comatulidae is a family of comatulid crinoids. Since 2015, it replaces the family Comasteridae.

Description and characteristics 
This family is of recent restoration, and still has no consensual description. However the description of the family Comasteridae remains partially valid.

This family counts between 93 and 95 species, distributed in 21 genera, which makes it the second most diversified family of crinoids the behind Antedonidae, representing approximately 1/6th of known crinoid species. It contains most of the big species of shallow tropical feather stars, in particular in the Indo-Pacific.

List of genera 
This family has been recently restored following genetic works from Charles Messing's team.

It contains the following genera:
 sub-family Comatellinae Summers, Messing, Rouse, 2014
 genus Alloeocomatella Messing, 1995 -- 2 species
 genus Comatella AH Clark, 1908 -- 2 species
 genus Davidaster Hoggett & Rowe, 1986 -- 2 species
 genus Nemaster AH Clark, 1909 -- 1 species
 genus Comatilia AH Clark, 1909 -- 1 species
 genus Comatulides AH Clark, 1918 -- 1 species
 sub-family Comatulinae Fleming, 1828
 Tribe Capillasterini AH Clark, 1909
 genus Capillaster AH Clark, 1909 -- 8 species
 Tribe Comasterini AH Clark, 1908
 genus Anneissia Summers, Messing, Rouse, 2014 -- 8 species
 genus Cenolia AH Clark, 1916 -- 6 species
 genus Clarkcomanthus Rowe, Hoggett, Birtles & Vail, 1986 -- 9 species
 genus Comanthus AH Clark, 1908 -- 11 species
 genus Comaster L. Agassiz, 1836 -- 4 species
 Tribe Comatulini Fleming, 1828
 genus Comactinia AH Clark, 1909 -- 3 species
 genus Comatula Lamarck, 1816 -- 7 species
 Tribe Neocomatellini Summers, Messing, Rouse, 2014
 genus Comatulella AH Clark, 1911 -- 1 species
 genus Neocomatella AH Clark, 1909 -- 3 species
 Tribe Phanogeniini White & Messing, 2001 (in White & al., 2001)
 genus Aphanocomaster Messing, 1995 -- 1 species
 genus Comissia Clark, 1909 -- 14 species
 genus Phanogenia Lovén, 1866 -- 9 species
 genus Palaeocomatella AH Clark, 1912 -- 3 species
 genus Rowemissia Messing, 2001 -- 1 species
 Comatulidae incertae sedis—6 species

References

Comatulida
Echinoderm families